Vescovi may refer to:
People
Giovanni Vescovi (born 1978), Brazilian chess player
Joe Vescovi (1949–2014), Italian keyboardist
Raffaello Vescovi (born 1940), Italian soccer player
Geography
Punta Tre Vescovi, mountain in Italy
Rocca dei Tre Vescovi, mountain bordering France and Italy